Gruzinskoye is a rural locality (a selo) in Novoserebryakovsky Selsoviet, Kizlyarsky District, Republic of Dagestan, Russia. The population was 193 as of 2010. There are 2 streets.

Geography 
Gruzinskoye is located 34 km northeast of Kizlyar (the district's administrative centre) by road. Novaya Serebryakovka and Chernyayevka are the nearest rural localities.

Nationalities 
Dargins and Kumyks live there.

References 

Rural localities in Kizlyarsky District